Goldstick is a surname. Notable people with the surname include:

Dan Goldstick (born 1940), Canadian philosopher, writer, and political activist
Oliver Goldstick (born 1961), American television screenwriter and producer